The 2006 Carlsberg Cup was a football tournament held in Hong Kong over the first and fourth day of the Chinese New Year holiday (29 January and 1 February 2006).

Participating teams
 (first appearance)
 (third appearance)
 (host)
 (second appearance)

Squads

Head coach: Zlatko Kranjčar

Head coach: Morten Olsen

Head coach: Lai Sun Cheung

Head coach:  Dick Advocaat

Results
All times given in Hong Kong Time (UTC+8).

Semifinals

Third place match

Final

Top scorers
1 goal
 Ivan Bošnjak
 Eduardo
 Dario Knežević
 Jerko Leko
 Thomas Augustinussen
 Jesper Bech
 Søren Berg
 Anders Due
 Lars Jacobsen
 Michael Silberbauer
 Cho Jae-jin
 Kim Dong-jin
 Lee Chun-soo

See also
Hong Kong Football Association
Hong Kong First Division League

External links
2006 Carlsberg Cup at rsssf
2006 Carlsberg Cup at futbolplanet.de

2006
2005–06 in Hong Kong football
2005–06 in Croatian football
2005–06 in Danish football
2006 in South Korean football